Ghislain Bell Bell (born 12 September 1985) is a former Cameroonian-born Hong Kong professional footballer who played as a centre back.

Career statistics

Club

Notes

References

External links
 Yau Yee Football League profile

Living people
1985 births
Cameroonian footballers
Hong Kong footballers
Association football defenders
Hong Kong Premier League players
Hong Kong First Division League players
Hong Kong Rangers FC players
Hong Kong FC players
Naturalized footballers of Hong Kong
Cameroonian emigrants to Hong Kong